Ubiquitin-conjugating enzymes, also known as E2 enzymes and more rarely as ubiquitin-carrier enzymes, perform the second step in the ubiquitination reaction that targets a protein for degradation via the proteasome. The ubiquitination process covalently attaches ubiquitin, a short protein of 76 amino acids, to a lysine residue on the target protein. Once a protein has been tagged with one ubiquitin molecule, additional rounds of ubiquitination form a polyubiquitin chain that is recognized by the proteasome's 19S regulatory particle, triggering the ATP-dependent unfolding of the target protein that allows passage into the proteasome's 20S core particle, where proteases degrade the target into short peptide fragments for recycling by the cell.

Relationships
A ubiquitin-activating enzyme, or E1, first activates the ubiquitin by covalently attaching the molecule to its active site cysteine residue. The activated ubiquitin is then transferred to an E2 cysteine. Once conjugated to ubiquitin, the E2 molecule binds one of several ubiquitin ligases or E3s via a structurally conserved binding region. The E3 molecule is responsible for binding the target protein substrate and transferring the ubiquitin from the E2 cysteine to a lysine residue on the target protein.

A particular cell usually contains only a few types of E1 molecule, a greater diversity of E2s, and a very large variety of E3s. In humans, there are about 30 E2s which can bind with one of the 600+ E3s. The E3 molecules responsible for substrate identification and binding are thus the mechanisms of substrate specificity in proteasomal degradation. Each type of E2 can associate with many E3s.

E2s can also be used to study protein folding mechanisms. Since the ubiquitylation system is shared across all organisms, studies can use modified E2 proteins in order to understand the overall system for how all organisms process proteins. There are also some proteins which can act as both and E2 and an E3 containing domains which cover both E2 and E3 functionality.

Isozymes 

The following human genes encode ubiquitin-conjugating enzymes:

 UBE2A
 UBE2B
 UBE2C
 UBE2D1, UBE2D2, UBE2D3, UBE2D4 (the latter putative)
 UBE2E1, UBE2E2, UBE2E3
 UBE2F (putative)
 UBE2G1, UBE2G2
 UBE2H
 UBE2I
 UBE2J1, UBE2J2
 UBE2K
 UBE2L3, UBE2L6; (UBE2L1, UBE2L2, UBE2L4 are pseudogenes)
 UBE2M
 UBE2N
 UBE2O
 UBE2Q1, UBE2Q2
 UBE2R1 (CDC34), UBE2R2
 UBE2S
 UBE2T (putative)
 UBE2U (putative)
 UBE2V1, UBE2V2
 UBE2W (putative)
 UBE2Z
 ATG3
 BIRC6
 UFC1

See also 

 Ubiquitin
 Ubiquitin-activating enzyme
 Ubiquitin ligase

References

External links 
 
 

Proteins
Cell biology